Dublin High School is a public high school located in Dublin, Texas (USA) and classified as a 3A school by the UIL.  It is part of the Dublin Independent School District located in northeastern Erath County. In 2011, the school was rated "Academically Acceptable" by the Texas Education Agency.

Athletics
The Dublin Lions compete in the following sports 

Cross Country, Volleyball, Football, Basketball, Powerlifting, Golf, Tennis, Track, Softball & Baseball

State Titles
Boys Golf 
1979(1A)

References

External links
Dublin ISD
Dublin Lions Football

Schools in Erath County, Texas
Public high schools in Texas